Michel Bissonnet, MNA (born March 28, 1942) is a Canadian politician who served as Liberal member and President (House Speaker) of the National Assembly of Quebec.

Background

Bissonnet obtained a license in law at Université de Montréal in 1976 and was admitted to the Barreau du Québec the following year. Prior to his years as a lawyer, he worked for the City of Montreal for 17 years in various positions including archivist and assistant office manager.

NDP candidate

Bissonnet was formerly involved in the federal New Democratic Party and its Quebec wing, the defunct Nouveau Parti démocratique du Québec. He was a candidate in the 1967 federal by-election for that party in the district of Papineau. He finished third with 15% of the vote. Liberal candidate André Ouellet was elected.

City politics

He ran as an Action Laval candidate for the city council of Laval in 1969 and served as mayor for the city of Saint-Léonard from 1978 to 1981.

Member of the Provincial Legislature

Bissonnet successfully ran as the Liberal candidate in the district of Jeanne-Mance in the 1981 election.  He was re-elected in the 1985, 1989, 1994 and 1998 elections.  He also won re-election in the merged district of Jeanne-Mance–Viger in 2003 and 2007.

Speaker

He served as Vice-President of the National Assembly during his third term of office from 1989 to 1994, Assistant Whip of the Opposition from 1994 to 1997 and Third Vice-President of the National Assembly during his fifth term from 1999 to 2003. He became the President of the National Assembly (Speaker of the House) after the Liberal victory in 2003. In 2007, Bissonnet was reconfirmed as President of the National Assembly.

Borough Mayor

In July 2008, Bissonnet announced that he would leave provincial politics and run again for the mayoral position of Saint-Léonard, now a borough of Montreal following the 2002 amalgamation. He had become the longest serving MNA of the 38th National Assembly, even though he had never been appointed to the Cabinet.

Bissonnet ran under Montreal Mayor Gérald Tremblay's Union Montreal label. An election had been called to fill the position in the aftermath of the resignation of Frank Zampino.  Bissonnet was elected with 94.3% of the vote in September 2008, against Livio DiCelmo of Projet Montréal.

In the 2013 Montreal municipal elections, he was re-elected borough mayor of Saint-Léonard under Équipe Denis Coderre.

Electoral record (incomplete)

See also
National Assembly of Quebec
Politics of Quebec

Footnotes

External links

1942 births
French Quebecers
Living people
Mayors of places in Quebec
Presidents of the National Assembly of Quebec
Lawyers from Montreal
Quebec Liberal Party MNAs
Université de Montréal alumni
Montreal city councillors
People from Saint-Leonard, Quebec
New Democratic Party candidates for the Canadian House of Commons
Quebec candidates for Member of Parliament
Vice Presidents of the National Assembly of Quebec
21st-century Canadian politicians